Juno and Argus is a 1610 painting by Peter Paul Rubens, depicting Juno and Argus. It is now in the Wallraf-Richartz Museum (inventory number WRM 1040) in Cologne.

Bibliography 
Some of the literature in which this painting is discussed is listed here (most recent first).
 Nico Van Hout, Reconsidering Rubens's Flesh Colour, in: Boletin del Museo del Prado 19, 2001, p. 10
 Götz Pochat und Brigitte Wagber, Graz, 2000, p. 48, Fig. 5, p. 49
 Ekkehard Mai, in: Kölner Museums-Bulletin 2000/3, p. 39–43, Fig.7
 Robert Floetemeyer, Mainz 1998, pp. 142–144, Figure 40
 Fiona Healy, Rubens and the Judgement of Paris. A question of choice, Brepols 1997, p. 75, Fig. 98, p. 283
 Werner Telesko, in: , p. 18–20, Fig. 5
 Otto von Simson, Mainz 1996, p. 137–138, Figure 53
 Michel Blay, Paris 1995, Figure p. 85
 E. de Jongh, in: , 1995, p. 31, Fig. 40
 Hans Vlieghe und Ekkehard Mai (Hrsg.), p. 348, Figure p. 349, Cat. No. 44.5
 Michael Jaffé, Milano 1989, mit Figure, Cat. No. 142
 Ekkehard Mai, Köln 1987, pp. 32–44, Figure 25
 Wallraf-Richartz-Museum Köln, Köln, Mailand 1986, p. 134, with color reproduction
 Horst Vey und Annamaria Kesting, hrsg. v. Gert van der Osten und Horst Keller, Köln 1967, p. 95f., Figure 135
 H. G. Evers, Peter Paul Rubens, München 1942, pp. 116–121, Figure 61

1610 paintings
Mythological paintings by Peter Paul Rubens
Collections of the Wallraf–Richartz Museum
Birds in art
Juno (mythology)
Paintings of Roman goddesses